The Team Speedway Under-21 World Championship is a speedway competition to determine the World Championship for national Under-21 teams.  The sport's equivalent of the Under-21 World Cup in football, as of 2022 the title is awarded to the winners of SON2, the Under-21 division of the Speedway of Nations.  The first edition of the competition was in 2005 prior to its incorporation with the Speedway of Nations.

Poland has dominated the competition winning the title record 15 times.

Previous winners

Classification

Rules

Eligibility
The minimum age limit (16 years) starts on the date of the rider's birthday and the maximum age limit (21 years) finishes at the end of the year in which they reach 21 years old.

Team composition
The 4 competing teams shall each consist of 5 riders; there shall be no substitute rider:
Team A (Helmet colour Red): No 1, 2, 3, 4, 5
Team B (Blue): No 1, 2, 3, 4, 5
Team C (White): No 1, 2, 3, 4, 5
Team D (Yellow/Black): No 1, 2, 3, 4, 5

When a team is 6 or more points in arrears of the leading team, the team manager may substitute a rider in the next or succeeding heats with another rider in his team, However, each rider may be used as a substitute once only. Substitutions must stop when the team is less than 6 points in arrears.

Prize
in Swiss franc

See also
 Motorcycle speedway
 Speedway World Cup

References

 
Team 21